Samir Zazou (born March 24, 1980 in Sidi Bel Abbès) is an Algerian footballer who is currently playing as a defender for ASO Chlef in the Algerian Ligue Professionnelle 1.

National team statistics

Honours
 Won the Algerian Ligue Professionnelle 1 three times:
 Once with CR Belouizdad in 2001
 Once with JS Kabylie in 2006
 Once with ASO Chlef in 2011
 Has 5 caps for the Algerian National Team

References

External links
 

Living people
Algerian footballers
Algeria international footballers
1980 births
JS Kabylie players
CR Belouizdad players
ASO Chlef players
Algerian Ligue Professionnelle 1 players
Algeria A' international footballers
USM Annaba players
2011 African Nations Championship players
USM Bel Abbès players
People from Sidi Bel Abbès
Competitors at the 2001 Mediterranean Games
Association football defenders
Mediterranean Games competitors for Algeria
21st-century Algerian people